Omid Vahdat Football Club is an Iranian association football club based in Mashhad.This club announced its existence in the Azadegan League by buying the franchise of Shahr Khodro.

References

External links
Omid Vahdat Khorasan F.C. at Soccerway

Azadegan League
Football clubs in Iran
Sport in Mashhad